Stephen Henry Bear (born 15 January 1990) is an English reality show participant who won Celebrity Big Brother in August 2016. In March 2023, he was jailed for disclosing private, sexual photographs and films with intent to cause distress.

Early life 
Bear was born in Walthamstow, London, on 15 January 1990, the son of Stephen and Linda Bear. According to his own testimony, he worked as a labourer and then a roofer before he began undertaking work in television.

Career
Bear's first TV appearance was in 2011 on Shipwrecked. He also went on to appear in the MTV reality show Ex on the Beach in 2015, and then again in 2016. He won the eighteenth series of Celebrity Big Brother in 2016.

Prosecution
Bear was arrested in January 2021, following an investigation into the alleged disclosure of sexual photographs without consent. He was charged on 14 May 2021 with voyeurism, disclosing private, sexual photographs and films with intent to cause distress, and harassment without violence.
Bear pleaded not guilty, but on 13 December 2022 he was found guilty. On 3 March 2023, Bear was jailed for 21 months.

Filmography

Book
 Bear's Necessities (2017)

References

1990 births
Living people
Big Brother (British TV series) winners
Criminals from London
English prisoners and detainees
English sex offenders
People convicted of sex crimes
People from Walthamstow
Prisoners and detainees of England and Wales
Reality show winners
Television personalities from London
The Challenge (TV series) contestants